Guagua is a  municipality in Pampanga, Philippines.

Guagua  may also refer to:
Guagua (instrument), or catá, a Cuban percussion instrument
Guagua language, or Piaroa, an indigenous language of Colombia and Venezuela

People with the surname
Jorge Guagua (born 1981), an Ecuadorian footballer